Ganoderic acids are a class of closely related triterpenoids (derivatives from lanosterol) found in Ganoderma mushrooms.  For thousands of years, the fruiting bodies of Ganoderma fungi have been used in traditional medicines in East Asia. Consequently, there have been efforts to identify the chemical constituents that may be responsible for the putative pharmacological effects.  There are dozens of ganoderic acids that have been isolated and characterized, of which ganoderic acid A and ganoderic acid B are the most well characterized.  Some ganoderic acids have been found to possess biological activities including hepatoprotection, anti-tumor effects, and 5-alpha reductase inhibition.

References

5α-Reductase inhibitors
Triterpenes
Cyclohexenols
Keto acids
Sterols
Enones